Kral, Král or KRAL may refer to:

Kral (surname)
Král (surname)
Kráľ (surname)
 Kráľ, a village in Slovakia
KRAL, an AM radio station licensed to Rawlins, Wyoming, U.S.
 Riverside Municipal Airport, Riverside, California, United States (ICAO code: KRAL)
Kral TV, a music television channel in Turkey
Kral Şakir, a Turkish anthropomorphical animated television series

See also 
 Kraal
 Krall (disambiguation)
 Krol